Peabutter is a savory spread used as an alternative to peanut butter.

History 

The product was first prepared by Alberta farmer Joe St. Denis in July 2002 who realized that the brown pea had certain similarities to peanuts. Oils such as canola and cottonseed are combined with icing sugar and mixed with crushed solid brown peas to form the spread.

Distribution 
Peabutter was distributed to the United States Armed Forces, which requested alternative products for those allergic to peanuts.

Concerns 
Children who are susceptible to peanut-triggered anaphylaxis may not be able to distinguish between peabutter and peanut butter. Some schools have also banned peabutter, fearing potential confusion with peanut butter.

References

Canadian snack foods
Legume dishes
Spreads (food)
Products introduced in 2002